The Marseilles Bridge is a bridge in Marseilles, Illinois.

History 
The bridge was completed in December 1997.

Bridges completed in 1997
Bridges in LaSalle County, Illinois
Bridges over the Illinois River
Concrete bridges in the United States
Road bridges in Illinois